The Croatian Hockey League Season for 2001–2002 resulted with KHL Medveščak winning the title for the sixth time in a row.

Teams
 KHL Mladost
 KHL Medveščak Zagreb
 KHL Zagreb
 HK Ina Sisak

Regular season

Playoffs

Semifinals
The semifinals on 19 and 21 February. 
Medvescak beat Sisak 2–0 in a best of three series. (32–3) and (20–1)
Zagreb beat Mladost in a best of three series. (7–3) and (18–1)

Finals
Medvescak beat Zagreb in a best of give series, by 3–2.
Medvescak – Zagreb 9–4
Zagreb – Medvešcak 5–1
Medvescak – Zagreb 8–5
Zagreb – Medvešcak 4–3 t.a.b.
Medvescak – Zagreb 4–1

Third place
Mladost beat Sisak in a best of five series, winning 3–0.
Mladost – INA Sisak 6–4
INA Sisak – Mladost 3–6
Mladost – INA Sisak 4–2

Croatian Ice Hockey League
1
Croatian Ice Hockey League seasons